Norman Stanley Gunter (born May 25, 1959) is an American politician from Georgia. Gunter is a Republican member of Georgia House of Representatives for District 8.

References

Republican Party members of the Georgia House of Representatives
21st-century American politicians
Living people
1959 births